is a former Japanese football player.

Playing career
Oishi was born in Shizuoka Prefecture on June 26, 1972. After graduating from Meiji University, he joined newly was promoted to J1 League club, Kashiwa Reysol in 1995. On October 4, he debuted as substitute midfielder at the 85th minutes against Gamba Osaka. However he could hardly play in the match until 1996 and retired end of 1996 season.

Club statistics

References

External links

1972 births
Living people
Meiji University alumni
Association football people from Shizuoka Prefecture
Japanese footballers
J1 League players
Kashiwa Reysol players
Association football midfielders